Mae Yom National Park is a national park in Phrae Province, Thailand.  The Yom River flows through the park.  The land is mountainous and fertile, and there are naturally grown teak trees.

Flora
The park is in the mountains of the Phi Pan Nam Range. It includes sections of moist evergreen forest, hill evergreen forest, mixed deciduous forest, and teak forest.

The site of the controversial Kaeng Suea Ten Dam on the Yom River, a dam that would destroy large areas of forest, is close to the southern edge of the park area.

Fauna
The park, with an area of 284,218 rai ~  is home to elephant, barking deer, Sumatran Serow, black bear, Wild Boar and hare species.

Attractions
Dong Sak Ngam
Kaeng Sua Ten
Lom Dong

Facilities
The park offers accommodations. There is also a visitor center and a grocery store.

See also
List of national parks of Thailand
List of Protected Areas Regional Offices of Thailand

References

National parks of Thailand
Protected areas established in 1986
Geography of Phrae province
Tourist attractions in Phrae province
1986 establishments in Thailand
Phi Pan Nam Range